Karayashnik is a rural locality (a sloboda) and the administrative center of Karayashnikovskoye Rural Settlement, Olkhovatsky District, Voronezh Oblast, Russia. The population was 621 as of 2010. There are 10 streets.

Geography 
Karayashnik is located 20 km north of Olkhovatka (the district's administrative centre) by road. Novomoskovsky is the nearest rural locality.

References 

Rural localities in Olkhovatsky District